In Greek mythology, Abia (Ancient Greek: Ἀβία) was the nursemaid of Hyllus, (in some translations the child she nurses is named Glenus) son of Heracles and Deianira, who settled there after the failed attempt of Heracles' son Hyllus to return to the Peloponnesus.

Mythology 
Abia was honored by the Heraclid Cresphontes for having built a temple to Heracles in Ira, by changing of the name of the town of Ira to Abia. Abia was one of the seven cities promised by Agamemnon to Achilles in his attempt to convince him to rejoin the Trojan War. At a later time, Abia would join the Achaean League. 

In Pausanias' Description of Greece the origin of the city's name and the stories surrounding it is explained:

 "There is in our time a city Abia in Messenia on the coast, some twenty stades distant from the Choerius valley. They say that this was formerly called Ire and was one of the seven cities which Homer says that Agamemnon promised to Achilles. When Hyllus and the Dorians were defeated by the Achaeans, it is said that Abia, nurse of Glenus the son of Heracles, withdrew to Ire, and settling there built a temple to Heracles, and that afterwards for this reason Cresphontes, amongst other honors assigned to her, renamed the city after Abia. There was a notable temple of Heracles here, and also of Asclepius."

Notes

References 

Bell, Robert E., Women of Classical Mythology: A Biographical Dictionary. ABC-Clio. 1991. .
Pausanias, Description of Greece with an English Translation by W.H.S. Jones, Litt.D., and H.A. Ormerod, M.A., in 4 Volumes. Cambridge, MA, Harvard University Press; London, William Heinemann Ltd. 1918. . Online version at the Perseus Digital Library
Pausanias, Graeciae Descriptio. 3 vols. Leipzig, Teubner. 1903.  Greek text available at the Perseus Digital Library.

Mythological nurses
Women in Greek mythology

Characters in Greek mythology